The 2008 Rink Hockey European Championship was the 48th edition of the Rink Hockey European Championship—the biennial rink hockey competition for European national teams, supervised by CERH—that took place in the Spanish city of Oviedo, at the local arena Palacio de los Deportes, on July 21–26, 2008. 
In a final against long-time rivals, Portugal, the hosts and holders Spain won their fifth consecutive European title.

Format
The tournament consists of two distinct phases: a single round-robin group phase and a knockout phase. In the first phase, the eight finalist teams are divided into two groups of four teams. Within each group, every team plays one match against all the other teams, to decide the group classification. 
Unlike previous editions, all participating teams advance to the quarterfinals phase, whatever their final placing in the group phase. In the quarterfinals, each group winner and the runner-up teams will play the third and fourth placed teams of the other group, respectively, for a place in the semifinals. The four losing teams will play one last game to decide their final ranking in the tournament.
The quarterfinal winning sides progress to the semifinals and the two winners meet in the title-awarding final. A game deciding the third and fourth place will be held between the semifinal losing sides.

Group phase
The group phase was contested on July 21–23, with two matches per group, each day. Group A was composed by France, Italy, Netherlands and hosts Spain; Group B included Germany, England, Portugal and Switzerland.

Group A

Group B

Knockout phase

Quarterfinals

Semifinals

Final

Classification

5th–8th

Third place

Final ranking

Goalscorers
Below is a list of all the tournament goalscorers by decreasing number of goals scored:

10 goals
  Ricardo Barreiros
7 goals
  Marc Gual
  Sébastien Landrin
6 goals
  Jens Behrendt
  Pedro Gil
  Josep Ordeig
5 goals
  Mark Wochnik
  Mattia Cocco
  Juan Travasino
  Ricardo Oliveira
4 goals
  Jordi Bargallo
  Valter Neves
3 goals
  Gael Jimenez

  Matthieu Infante
  Reinaldo Ventura
  Ricardo Pereira
  Sergi Panadero
  Federico Mendez
  Marc Waddingham
  Luis Viana
  Tiago Rafael
  Andreas Muenger
  Lluis Teixido
2 goals
  Dominic Wirth
  Arjan van Gerven
  Leonardo Squeo
  Felix Bender
  Rémi Lasnier
  Nicolas Guilbert
  Frédéric Hamon
  Guirec Henry
  Domenico Illuzzi

  John Jones
1 goal
  Pedro Moreira
  Marc Torra
  Michael Ableson
  Simon von Allmen
  Olivier Lesca
  Diego Nicoletti
  Robbie van Dooren
  James Taylor
  Mark Rutland
  Russell Lloyd
  Dominic Brandt
  Michael van Gemert
  Thomas Haupt
  Max Bros
  Igor Tarassioux

Squads

Spain

Portugal

France

References

CERH European Roller Hockey Championship
2008 in roller hockey
2008 in Spanish sport
International roller hockey competitions hosted by Spain